H. californiensis  may refer to:
 Halorubrum californiensis, a bacterium species in the genus Halorubrum
 Hesperodiaptomus californiensis, a crustacean species endemic to northern California
 Hypselodoris californiensis, the California blue dorid, a colourful sea slug species

See also
 List of Latin and Greek words commonly used in systematic names#C